Saman Priyanthaka (born 14 March 1983) is a Sri Lankan former cricketer. He played in 28 first-class and 22 List A matches between 2000/01 and 2012/13. He made his Twenty20 debut on 17 August 2004, for Kurunegala Youth Cricket Club in the 2004 SLC Twenty20 Tournament.

References

External links
 

1983 births
Living people
Sri Lankan cricketers
Kurunegala Youth Cricket Club cricketers
Place of birth missing (living people)